Donald McKay, named after her designer, was built for James Baines & Co. She was the last extreme clipper ship built by Donald McKay. Donald McKay sailed on the Black Ball Line of Liverpool from 1855 to 1868, carrying passengers and mail between England and Australia.

History 
Donald McKay was launched on Donald McKay's shipyard in East Boston, USA, in January 1855. Newspapers reported that she had "all the airy beauty of a clipper combined with the stately outline of a ship of war and, though not sharp, yet her great length, buoyancy, and stability, indicate[d] that she [would] sail very fast, and be an excellent sea boat". Her passenger capacity was reported at 591 plus crew.

Timeline of Donald McKay port calls and events:

 In 1855, on her maiden voyage, she sailed from Boston to Liverpool under command of Captain Henry Warner in 17 days.  
 In 1855, from 6 June to 21 August she sailed from Liverpool to Port Phillip, Melbourne, in 81 days. 
 In 1855, from 2 October to 28 December she sailed from Melbourne to Liverpool, in 86 days. 
 In 1856, from 4 October to 1(?) January 1957 she sailed from Liverpool to Melbourne.  
 In 1857, in February, she cleared out 365.25 ounces of gold through Melbourne customs for Liverpool. 
 In 1857, from 8 July to 29 September, she sailed from Liverpool to Port Phillip, Melbourne, in 83 days. 
 In 1857, in November, she cleared out 205 ounces of gold through Melbourne customs  and sailed to Liverpool from 5 December to 1 March 1858. 
 In 1858, on 8 August, she arrived in Melbourne from Liverpool. 
 In 1858, in November, she cleared out 34,390 ounces of gold through Melbourne customs for Liverpool.   
 In 1859, on 4 July, she arrived to Melbourne from Liverpool, in 87 days.   
 In 1859, on 8 November, she departed Port of Melbourne for Liverpool, carrying 4 ounces of gold. 
 In March 1861, upon arrival in Melbourne from Liverpool, Donald McKay was placed in quarantine due to cases of smallpox on board.  
 In 1862, on 9 October, arrived in Melbourne.  
 In 1863, on 30 July, arrived in Melbourne. 
 In March 1864, Donald McKay  bound for London collided with the barque Albina in the English Channel. Donald McKay was at fault and fined the full amount of the damage of £15,000 to Albina.
 In 1865, on 4 December, she arrived in Melbourne. 
 In 1866, she was sold to Thomas Harrison and was chartered back to the Black Ball Line under the new ownership.
 Her arrivals of the last three voyages to Melbourne were on 22 December 1866, 21 November 1867 and 19 November 1868.
 In 1874, after arriving in Melbourne on her 13th voyage, she was sold for £8,750. She was placed on the Pacific trade.
 In 1879, she was sold to the German company Bertus Bartlin' of Bremerhaven, reportedly becoming old and leaking water. 
 In 1886, she was used as a coal hulk in Madeira.
 In 1888, she caught fire and was broken up.

The figurehead of Donald McKay is located at the Mystic Seaport Museum in Mystic, Connecticut, USA.

See also 

 List of clipper ships

References

External links 

 Detailed description of Donald McKay, based on a 1855 Boston Daily Atlas article, source 1 and 2.
Donald McKay on Bruzelius
List of the ships of the Liverpool Black Line at TheShipsList
Era of the Clipper Ships

Individual sailing vessels
Ships designed by Donald McKay
Ships built in Boston
1855 ships